Incendies ("Fires") is a 2010 Canadian drama film directed by Denis Villeneuve, who co-wrote the screenplay with Valérie Beaugrand-Champagne. Adapted from Wajdi Mouawad's play of the same name, Incendies stars Lubna Azabal, Mélissa Désormeaux-Poulin, Maxim Gaudette, and Rémy Girard.

The story concerns Canadian twins who travel to their mother's native country in the Middle East to uncover her hidden past amidst a bloody civil war. While the country is unnamed, the events in the film are heavily influenced by the Lebanese Civil War and particularly the story of prisoner Souha Bechara. The film was shot mainly in Montreal, with a few days spent in Jordan.

It premiered at the Venice and Toronto Film Festivals in September 2010 and was released in Quebec on 17 September 2010. It met with critical acclaim in Canada and abroad and won numerous awards.

In 2011, it was nominated for the Academy Award for Best Foreign Language Film. Incendies also won eight Genie Awards, including Best Motion Picture.

Plot
Following the death of their mother Nawal, an Arab immigrant in Canada, Jeanne and her twin brother Simon meet with French Canadian notary Jean Lebel, their mother's employer and family friend. Nawal's will makes reference to not keeping a promise, denying her a proper gravestone and casket, unless Jeanne and Simon track down their mysterious brother, whose existence they were previously unaware of, and their father, who they believed was dead. Nawal has left two letters; one is to be delivered to Jeanne and Simon's father, and the other is to be delivered to their brother. Jeanne accepts; Simon, on the other hand, seemingly having had a more difficult relationship with Nawal and her apparently unusual personality, is reluctant to join Jeanne on this pursuit.

A series of flashbacks reveal Nawal came from a Christian Arab family in an unnamed Middle Eastern country, and that she fell in love with a refugee named Wahab, resulting in her pregnancy. Her family murders her lover and nearly shoots her as an honour killing, but her grandmother spares her, making her promise to leave the village after the birth of her baby and start a new life in the fictional city of Daresh. The grandmother tattoos the back of the baby's heel and sends him to an orphanage.

While Nawal is at university in Daresh, a civil war and war crimes break out with Nawal opposing the war on human rights grounds. Her son's orphanage in Kfar Khout is destroyed by a Muslim militant, Chamseddine, who converts him into an Islamic child soldier. After barely escaping the massacre of a bus full of Muslim refugees by Christian Nationalists, Nawal narrowly manages to join the Muslim fighters, and eventually shoots a nationalist leader. She is imprisoned in Kfar Ryat and raped by torturer Abou Tarek, consequently giving birth to the twins.

After travelling to her mother's native country, Jeanne gradually uncovers this past, and persuades Simon to join her. With help from Lebel, they learn their brother's name is Nihad of May and track down Chamseddine. Simon meets with him personally, and he reveals the war-mad Nihad was captured by the nationalists, turned by them, trained as a torturer, and then sent to Kfar Ryat, where he took the name Abou Tarek, making him both the twins' half-brother and father; as such, both letters are addressed to the same person. Like Nawal, Nihad's superiors gave him a new life in Canada after the war. By chance, Nawal encountered him at a Canadian swimming pool, and saw both the tattoo and his face. The shock of learning the truth caused Nawal to suffer a stroke which led to her decline and untimely death at age sixty.

The twins find Nihad in Canada and deliver Nawal's letters to him. He opens both of them; the first letter addresses him as the twins' father, the rapist, and is filled with contempt. The second letter addresses him as the twins' brother, and is instead written with caring words, saying that he, as Nawal's son, is deserving of love.

Nawal gets her gravestone.  Some time later, Nihad visits it.

Cast

Production

Development

Parts of the story were based on the life of Souha Bechara. The story is based on events that happened during the Lebanese Civil War of 1975 to 1990, but the filmmakers attempted to make the location of the plot ambiguous.

Director Denis Villeneuve first saw Wajdi Mouawad's play Incendies at Théâtre de Quat'Sous in Montreal in 2004, commenting "I had this strong intuition that I was in front of a masterpiece". Villeneuve acknowledged unfamiliarity with Arab culture, but was drawn to Incendies as "a modern story with a sort of Greek tragedy element". In adapting the screenplay, Villeneuve, while keeping the story structure and characters, replaced "all" the dialogue, even envisioning a silent film, abandoning the idea due to expense. He showed Mouawad some completed scenes to convince the initially reluctant playwright to grant permission for the film. Villeneuve spent five years working on the screenplay, in between directing two films. Mouawad later praised the film as "brilliantly elegant" and gave Villeneuve full credit. The project had a budget of $6.5 million, and received funding from Telefilm Canada.

Casting

For the part of Nawal, Villeneuve said he conducted an extensive search for actresses across Canada. He considered casting the main character to be the most challenging, and at one point contemplated using two or three actresses to play the character, since the story spans four decades. He finally met Lubna Azabal, a Belgian actress of Moroccan—Spanish descent in Paris, intrigued by her "expressive and eloquent" face in Paradise Now (2005). Although she was 30, Villeneuve thought she appeared 18 and could play the part throughout the entire film, using makeup.

Villeneuve selected Canadian actress Mélissa Désormeaux-Poulin to play Jeanne, saying the role required listening skills and Désormeaux-Poulin is "a very generous actress". Before Incendies, Désormeaux-Poulin was mainly known for "light fare". Montreal actor Allen Altman, who played a notary, worked with a dialect coach for hours to develop a blend of the French and Arab accents before auditioning. While shooting in Jordan, to research his role, actor Maxim Gaudette toured a Palestinian refugee camp near Amman.

Filming

The film was shot in Montreal and Jordan. The film took 40 days to shoot, of which 15 were spent in Jordan, with Villeneuve aiming to film no scene without being sure it would not be cut.

For the scenes filmed in Jordan, Villeneuve used a Lebanese and Iraqi crew, though he feared the war scenes would be too reminiscent of bad experiences for them. However, he said the Arab crew members felt "It’s important that those sorts of stories are on the screen". Some of the filming in Jordan took place in the capital of Amman. To recreate Beirut, art director André-Line Beauparlant built up rock and debris on a street in Amman.

Music
Two tracks by British band Radiohead from their album Amnesiac, "You and Whose Army?" and "Like Spinning Plates", were used in the film. The music was considered so notable and integral to the film that the music was mentioned in many reviews. Film critic David Ehrlich wrote that "Incendies exploits Radiohead tracks for the multiplicity of their meaning, empowering the image by dislocating viewers from it". Villeneuve said that he had written "You and Whose Army?" into the script from the beginning, as it was intended to make it "clear that [the film] will be a westerner’s point of view about this world". One music reviewer gave it first place in their "Top Ten Music Moments in Film".

Release
Incendies was officially selected to play in the 2010 Venice Film Festival, 2010 Telluride Film Festival, 2010 Toronto International Film Festival, 2011 Sundance Film Festival and 2011 New Directors/New Films Festival. The film opened in Toronto and Vancouver in January 2011.

In the United States, the film was distributed by Sony Pictures Classics. When the film was screened in Beirut in March 2011, Villeneuve claimed "a lot of people said to me that we should show this film to their children, to show them what they had been through".

Reception

Box office
In Canada, the film passed the $1 million mark at the box office by October 2010. By the end of April 2011, the film grossed $4.7 million. In Quebec theatres alone, Incendies made $3 million. It was considered a success in the country.

According to Box Office Mojo, the film completed its theatrical run on September 29, 2011 after making $2,071,334 in the U.S. According to The Numbers, the film grossed $6,857,096 in North America and $9,181,247 in other territories for a worldwide total of $16,038,343.

Critical response
Incendies received highly positive reviews from critics. Review aggregation website Rotten Tomatoes reports 93% positive reviews based on 121 reviews, with an average rating of 7.92/10. The site's critics consensus reads, "It's messy, overlong, and a touch melodramatic, but those flaws pale before Incendies impressive acting and devastating emotional impact." On Metacritic the film has a weighted average score of 80 out 100 based on 42 reviews, indicating "generally favorable reviews".

The film enjoyed a positive reception in its country and province. Kevin N. Laforest of the Montreal Film Journal gave it 3.5 stars out of four and wrote, "Villeneuve has done his best work yet here". The Montreal Gazette'''s Brendan Kelly gave the film five stars and called it a "masterwork".  Marc Cassivi of La Presse claimed the film transcended the play. Peter Howell, writing for The Toronto Star, gave the film four stars, called it "a commanding film of multiple revelations", and the best of 2010, and praised Lubna Azabal as "first amongst equals". However, Martin Morrow of CBC News was unimpressed, saying, "Villeneuve’s screen adaptation strips away all this finely textured flesh and leaves only the bare bones". University of Berlin film scholar Claudia Kotte wrote that the film, along with Monsieur Lazhar (2011) and War Witch (2012), represent a break in the Cinema of Quebec from focus on local history to global concerns, with Incendies adding Oedipal themes. Authors Gada Mahrouse,  Chantal Maillé and Daniel Salée wrote McCraw and Déry's films, Incendies, Monsieur Lazhar and Inch'Allah, depict Quebec as part of the global village and as accepting minorities, particularly Middle Easterners or "Muslim Others".

Roger Ebert gave the film three and a half stars, saying "it wants to be much more than a thriller and succeeds in demonstrating how senseless and futile it is to hate others because of their religion", and Azabal "is never less than compelling". He later selected the film as his favourite to win the Academy Award for Best Foreign Language Film, though it lost to In a Better World from Denmark. Leonard Maltin also gave the film three and a half stars, referring to it as "tough, spellbinding". Ty Burr, writing for The Boston Globe, gave the film three and a half stars, praising a bus scene as harrowing but saying the climax is "a plot twist that feels like one coincidence too far", that "leaves the audience doing math on their fingers rather than reeling in shock". Incendies was named by Stephen Holden of The New York Times as one of the 10 best films of 2011. Betsy Sharkey of the Los Angeles Times called it Villeneuve’s "best-realized work yet". A number of reviews complimented use of the song "You and Whose Army?" by Radiohead. Criticisms have included charges of melodrama and orientalism.

Accolades
On 22 September 2010, Incendies was chosen to represent Canada at the 83rd Academy Awards in the category of Best Foreign Language Film. It made the shortlist on 19 January 2011, one of nine films and was nominated for the Academy Award for Best Foreign Language Film on 25 January 2011.

It won eight awards at the 31st Genie Awards, including Best Motion Picture, Best Actress for Azabal and Best Director for Villeneuve. Along with Incendies, Villeneuve won the Rogers Best Canadian Film Award in 2009 for the film Polytechnique, the first Canadian filmmaker to win it twice in a row.  Incendies'' also won the Prix Jutra for Best Film, Director, Screenplay, Actress (Azabal), Editing, Cinematography, Art Direction, Costumes and Sound.

It is also the only film to date to have won both the Toronto International Film Festival Award for Best Canadian Film and the Vancouver International Film Festival Award for Best Canadian Film.

See also
 List of submissions to the 83rd Academy Awards for Best Foreign Language Film
 List of Canadian submissions for the Academy Award for Best Foreign Language Film

References

External links
 
 
  
  
 
 
 
 
 

2010 films
2010 war drama films
2010s Arabic-language films
Best Picture Genie and Canadian Screen Award winners
Best French-Language Film Lumières Award winners
Canadian mystery films
2010 independent films
Canadian independent films
Canadian war drama films
Drama films based on actual events
Films set in prison
Films set in Montreal
Films set in the Middle East
Films shot in Montreal
Films shot in Jordan
Films based on Canadian plays
Films directed by Denis Villeneuve
2010s French-language films
Incest in film
Lebanese Civil War films
Canadian nonlinear narrative films
Films about rape
Sony Pictures Classics films
War films based on actual events
Films about mother–son relationships
Best Film Prix Iris winners
2010 multilingual films
Canadian multilingual films
French-language Canadian films
Arabic-language Canadian films
2010s Canadian films